, also known as Masato Simon, is a retired Japanese vocalist from Meguro, Tokyo. He is most known for his contributions to the theme songs of various anime and tokusatsu series. "Masato Shimon" is also his recording name, as he was born with the name . He recorded a song "Oyoge! Taiyaki-kun" (1975) with only 50,000 yen, but the single sold 4,547,620 copies and became the best-selling single in Japan, a fact certified by Guinness World Records.

References 

 Masato Shimon at the Henshin Hall of Fame

External links 
 
 

Japanese male singers
1944 births
People from Meguro
Japanese Anglicans
Living people
Anime musicians